Bela turgida is a species of sea snail, a marine gastropod mollusk in the family Mangeliidae.

This name of this species is considered a nomen dubium

Nomenclature
Nordsieck (1977: 45) interpreted Pleurotoma turgida Reeve 1844 as a synonym of the preoccupied Pleurotoma nana Scacchi, 1836. However, van Aartsen (1988) considered P. turgida as a nomem dubium, despite the fact that Reeve's name (which was based on the same Aegean material of Forbes (1844) and proposed a replacement name Bela menkhorsti

References

 van Aartsen J. J. (1988). Nomenclatural notes 7. Forbes' Aegean Turridae. Bollettino Malacologico 24 (5-8): 141-144
 Mariottini P., Smriglio C., Di Giulio A. & Oliverio M. (2009). "A new fossil conoidean from the Pliocene of Italy, with comments on the Bela menkhorsti complex (Gastropoda: Conidae)". Journal of Conchology 40(1): 5-14

External links
 Tucker, J.K. 2004 Catalog of recent and fossil turrids (Mollusca: Gastropoda). Zootaxa 682:1-1295.

turgida
Gastropods described in 1844